Solanum tobagense is a species of plant in the family Solanaceae. It is found in Guyana, Trinidad and Tobago, and Venezuela.

References

tobagense
Near threatened plants
Taxonomy articles created by Polbot